La pointe de Cornouaille is a cape to the north of the hamlet of Kerviniou in France.  They are both situated on the Roscanvel peninsula and, facing as it does the Fort du Mengant, a battery on the point forms part of the defences of the goulet de Brest.
Known defences on the site include:

 Lower battery (1694) - built to plans by Vauban
 Tour modèle n°1 (1813) - see Tour-modèle type 1811
 Batterie de rupture sous roc (1888) 
 Batterie du plateau (1897)
 Batterie de DCA allemande (1943, German)
 Torpedo-boat battery (German)

References

Cornouaille
Landforms of Finistère
Headlands of Brittany